Léon Zitrone (25 November 1914 – 25 November 1995) was a Russian-born French journalist and television presenter.

Biography
Zitrone was born in Petrograd, Russia. He arrived in France with his family fleeing communism at the age of six. He graduated from the ESJ Paris. He began by training in scientific studies but his mastership of Russian, French, English and German gave him entrance in 1948 to the radio foreign broadcasting services of Radiodiffusion-Télévision Française (RTF). In 1959, he joined the television activity of RTF. From 1961, he became news presenter, function he occupied for nearly 20 years, first until 1975, on the first French television channel (now TF1), then also on Antenne 2, the other public service channel. Jean-Pierre Elkabbach called him back in 1979. He then took charge of the news program during the week-end (his contract was established until 1 February 1981). He would come back for those news programs also during the Easter and Pentecost week-ends.

But Léon Zitrone's celebrity is due to the programs he presented or co-presented. He was host of the televised program Intervilles (French counterpart of Britain's It's a Knockout) with Guy Lux. He commented 6 times on the Tour de France, and he is remembered for his prodigious memory for names of riders. He presented the Olympics 8 times, commented the Eurovision Song Contest on 4 occasions and presented 16 Bastille Day military parades. Above all, he was the key-commenter for big events, such as weddings, burials or investitures of world's key figures, some thirty of them during the course of his career.

In 1978, following French singer Marie Myriam's victory the previous year, the Eurovision song contest took place in Paris. Léon Zitrone co-presented with Denise Fabre and made the presentation in English. He was the oldest host of the Eurovision Song Contest, aged of 63.

In 1984, Zitrone took a leading role in the movie American Dreamer.

Death
He died from a cerebral hemorrhage on his 81st birthday, 25 November 1995, at the Val-de-Grâce hospital in Paris.

Filmography

References

See also
 List of Eurovision Song Contest presenters
 Le Gentleman d'Epsom (film, 1962)

1914 births
1995 deaths
French male journalists
French television journalists
French reporters and correspondents
French people of Russian-Jewish descent
Mass media people from Paris
Russian Jews
Burials at Levallois-Perret Cemetery
École supérieure de journalisme de Paris alumni
Chevaliers of the Légion d'honneur